Dalbraminol is a beta blocker.

References

Beta blockers
Pyrazoles